Nowchah (also Romanized as Nowchāh) is a village in Torqabeh Rural District, Torqabeh District, Torqabeh and Shandiz County, Razavi Khorasan Province, Iran. At the 2006 census, its population was 726, in 185 families.

References 

Populated places in Torqabeh and Shandiz County